The Melobesioideae are a subfamily of Corallinacean Coralline algae with multiporate conceptacles.

References

Bikont subfamilies
Corallinales